The 2016 City of Onkaparinga ATP Challenger was a professional tennis tournament played on hard courts. It was the second edition of the tournament which was part of the 2016 ATP Challenger Tour. It took place in Happy Valley, South Australia, Australia between 2–10 January 2016.

On 29 December 2015, Tennis South Australia Chief Executive Officer, Steven Baldas confirmed 15 players from inside the world's top 200 would compete, with Israel's Dudi Sela the highest ranked player in the field.

ATP entrants

Seeds

 1 Rankings are as of December 28, 2015.

Other entrants
The following players received wildcards into the singles main draw:
 Matthew Barton
 Alex Bolt
 Bradley Mousley
 Marc Polmans

The following players received entry from the qualifying draw:
 Maverick Banes
 Dayne Kelly
 Peter Polansky
 Andrew Whittington

Champions

Singles

 Taylor Fritz def.  Dudi Sela 7–6(9–7), 6–2

Doubles

 Matteo Donati /  Andrey Golubev def.  Denys Molchanov /  Aleksandr Nedovyesov 3–6, 7–6(7–5), [10–1]

References

External links
Official Website

City of Onkaparinga ATP Challenger
City of Onkaparinga ATP Challenger
2016 in Australian tennis